The undefined borders of the Albanian state following the Treaty of London in 1913, made way for instability within Albania and the potential for her neighbours to claim certain sections of her yet to be defined lands. When the Kingdom of Serbs, Croats and Slovenes (Yugoslavia) decided to press claims to the lands in the North of Albania following a rebellion there, and escalated the situation by sending troops to the Albanian borders, war loomed on the horizon for both countries. Which encouraged the League of Nations to try and settle the situation in a peaceful manner.

Background 
At the conclusion of the First Balkan War in 1913, the Treaty of London was signed which dealt with the territorial adjustments of the Balkan region and among others, established the rough borders and recognized the independence of Albania. The refining of Albania's borders were to be determined by the great powers, however progress was halted due to the outbreak of the First World War. The frontiers of the newly established Principality of Albania had not been set during the Paris Peace Conference following the war in 1919. So the issue was left to be resolved by the newly erected League of Nations in 1920. When the final decision regarding Albania's borders had not yet been determined by the following year, the situation quickly became unstable due to unrest both within and outside Albania's proposed borders.

Rebellion in Mirdita 
Marka Gjoni, a chieftain of the dominantly Roman Catholic Mirdita region and tribe in Northern Albania, believing that the Albanian government were going to ban Catholicism, let the Yugoslav authorities on his behalf proclaim the Mirdita Republic on 17 July 1921 in Prizren, Yugoslavia. Gjoni received Yugoslav support, weapons and money as the Yugoslav government saw the newly founded republic as a helpful asset in their efforts to weaken the Albanian state by means of aiding separatist regions in the country such as Mirdita and fueling religious unrest to negotiate a more advantageous border demarcation between their own territory and Albania's. Gjoni urged the Yugoslav government to take steps to secure the recognition of the Mirdita republic, but Yugoslavia was mainly interested in seeking potential territorial claims to the republic itself. Therefore Greece became the only country to recognize the Mirdita republic as an independent state.

At the League of Nations, the Yugoslav government fueled more religious unrest by accusing the Albanian government of holding only the interest of the Muslim population at heart while suppressing the country's Catholic population. Albania's government responded by stating that it represented all Albanians regardless of religious beliefs. But the Yugoslav government argued that due to the existence of the Mirdita republic, the Albanian response was invalid and threw Albania's status of being a country into question, thus affecting it being a League member. The Yugoslav delegation stated that while two governments existed in Albania, a unity between the people could not exist.

Escalation of hostilities 
Regardless of the accusations of the Yugoslav government, determined the Albanian government that the existence of the republic was a violation of the sovereignty of the Albanian state. And as a result, started readying troops to squash the rebellion. Meanwhile, in August 1921, representatives of both Yugoslavia and the Mirdita Republic signed an agreement which stated that the republic would be defended by Yugoslav military forces and the interests of the republic abroad would be represented by the Yugoslav government. This prompted Albania to accuse Yugoslavia of instigating the rebellion and aiding the separatists.

In September 1921, Greek troops conducted military operations in Southern Albania while Yugoslav forces occupied Northern Albania after some clashes with Northern tribesmen. Albania gained the support of Italy who advised them to engage the rebels and invaders from both a military and diplomatic standpoint. So having been a League of Nations member since 1920, the Albanian government therefore asked the league to recognize Albania's predetirmend borders from the Treaty of London in 1913 and finalize any discrepancies. The urgency of the situation became evermore clear to the league when by the end of September Albanian and Yugoslav troops were standing eye to eye at the demarcation line, with skirmishes in the region of Lurija and Tedrina lasting several weeks and moving the front lines. So, on 2 October 1921, the Assembly of the League of Nations voted unanimously to let the Great Powers settle the border conflict and recommended Albania to accept beforehand the ramifications of their decision.

Border war 
After Yugoslav forces gained the upper hand at the demarcation line by the end of October 1921, the decision was made by the Yugoslav government to invade Albanian territory beyond the areas they had already occupied. In response the League of Nations dispatched a commission (Conference of Ambassadors) composed of representatives from the United Kingdom, France, Italy and Japan, who on 7 November 1921 concluded that the Yugoslav government was the culprit of the conflict and ordered them to cease hostilities against Albania and withdraw all their troops from foreign territory. The Yugoslav government denied all accusations directed at them and didn't answer the commissions call to retreat from Albanian soil. In response, the commission announced its decision about Albania's borders to the public on 9 November 1921.

The League of Nations confirmed with special resolution the decision of the Conference of Ambassadors from 9 November between 17 November and 19 November 1921. Albania was asked to submit a report to the League about the retreat of Yugoslav, Greek and Albanian troops from the demarcation line and "take necessary security measures" against local movements that endangered the internal peace of Albania. Great Britain's prime minister Lloyd George had recognized the Albanian government that same month and also made multiple heated diplomatic protests against the Yugoslav government, demanding its withdrawal from disputed areas. Due to Britain's intervention and the possibilities of sanctions against their country, Yugoslav support for Gjoni ended and Yugoslavia withdrew its troops from all Albanian territories as stated in the 1913 Treaty of London, albeit under protest.

Aftermath 
With the withdrawal of the Yugoslav troops, the Mirdita Republic became quickly overrun by Albanian government troops and irregular forces under the command of Ahmet Zog. The rebellion was ended by 20 November 1921 after negotiations with local Mirditor elders who agreed to surrender to Zog if no reprisals would occur. Marka Gjoni fled to Yugoslavia, while Mirdita was placed under siege with Gjoni's followers being proclaimed as traitors and other rebels were sentenced in a government political court, though no real persecution fell on the main leaders. As a result of the rebellion, Mirditan autonomy was abolished by the Albanian government.

In the meantime a new Delimitation Commission was formed which would finalize and confirm the official Albanian border, while the United Kingdom insisted on slight adaptations in the region of Debar, Prizren and Kastrati in the interest of Yugoslavia. In an effort to gain the favor of the Border Demarcation Commission, Albania and Yugoslavia established formal diplomatic relations in March 1922 and thereby also accepted the League's decision on the matter of Albania's frontiers. By this act, Yugoslavia also recognised the independence and sovereignty of the Albanian state which meant that Yugoslav policy of military engagement in Albania had ended in defeat. Gjoni later returned to Albania and remained active as a political leader in Mirdita until his death in 1925.

References

Sources

1920s in Albania
1920s in Yugoslavia
1921 in Albania
Conflicts in 1921
League of Nations
Wars involving Albania
Interwar period
1921 in Europe
History of Europe
History of Yugoslavia
History of Albania